The Cincinnati Cheetahs were an American soccer team that played in Cincinnati, Ohio.

During their 1994 season, the Cheetahs' home field was at St. Xavier High School in Springfield Township, Hamilton County.

Year-by-year

References

Defunct soccer clubs in Ohio
Cheetahs
USISL teams
St. Xavier High School (Ohio)
1994 establishments in Ohio
1995 disestablishments in Ohio
Association football clubs established in 1994
Association football clubs disestablished in 1995